Henricus Gregorius Jozeph "Henk" Kamp (born 23 July 1952) is a Dutch politician of the People's Party for Freedom and Democracy (VVD) who served as Minister of Defence in the Cabinet Rutte III from 24 September 2021 to 10 January 2022. He previously served as Minister of Defence in the Cabinets Balkenende I, II and III from 12 December 2002 until 22 February 2007.

Kamp studied Customs at the Civil Service Academy in Utrecht. Kamp worked as a tax collector for the Fiscal Information and Investigation Service (FIOD) of the Tax and Customs Administration from April 1980 until May 1994. After the election of 1994 Kamp was elected as a Member of the House of Representatives on 17 May 1994 and served as a frontbencher and spokesperson for Integration. After the election of 2002 Kamp was appointed as Minister of Housing, Spatial Planning and the Environment in the Cabinet Balkenende I taking office on 22 July 2002. The Cabinet Balkenende I fell just 87 days into its term and shortly thereafter was appointed as Minister of Defence following the resignation of Benk Korthals taking office on 12 December 2002. After the election of 2003 Kamp continued as Minister of Defence in the Cabinet Balkenende II. The Cabinet Balkenende fell on 30 June 2006 was replaced with the caretaker Cabinet Balkenende III with Kamp retaining his position. After the election of 2006 Kamp returned to the House of Representatives on 30 November 2006 and served as a frontbencher and spokesperson for Kingdom Relations. In December 2008 Kamp was nominated as the first Governor of the Caribbean Netherlands serving from 1 January 2009 until 10 October 2010.

After the election of 2010 Kamp was appointed as Minister of Social Affairs and Employment in the Cabinet Rutte I taking office 14 October 2010. The Cabinet Rutte I fell 18 months into its term and shortly thereafter announced that he would not stand for the election of 2012 but accept to serve in a new cabinet position. After the election Kamp was appointed as Minister of Economic Affairs in the Cabinet Rutte II taking office on 5 November 2012. In February 2016 Kamp announced his retirement and that he wouldn't stand for the election of 2017 and declined to serve in new cabinet.

Kamp retired from active politics at 65 and became active in the private and public sectors as a corporate and non-profit director and serves on several state commissions and councils on behalf of the government, and works as a trade association executive serving as Chairman of the Healthcare Providers association since January 2018 and became a Member of the Social and Economic Council for the Industry and Employers confederation (VNO-NCW) in February 2018.

Early life
Henricus Gregorius Jozeph Kamp was born on 23 July 1952 in Hengelo in the Netherlands Province of Overijssel in a Roman Catholic family. He left the Roman Catholic faith years later and became a Humanist. After completing his HAVO diploma he worked at two wholesalers in Enschede, Borculo and Tilburg until 1977. From 1977 to 1980 he attended the auditors training at the Tax Training in Utrecht. He worked as an investigator for the Fiscal Intelligence and Investigation Service  (FIOD) until 1986.

Politics

From 1976 to 1994 he was a member of the municipal council in Borculo. From 1986 he was in also alderman in Borculo. From 1987 to 1994 he was a member of the Provincial Council of Gelderland. He became a Member of the House of Representatives on 17 May 1994. On 22 July 2002, Kamp became Minister of Housing, Spatial Planning and the Environment. He was Minister of Defence from December 12, 2002, till 22 February 2007. After early elections were held as a result of parliamentary agreements following the formation of the  minority cabinet Balkenende III. As part of his "farewell tour" as Minister of Defence, Henk Kamp visited the Dutch troops in Afghanistan and paid his respects to president Hamid Karzai. President Karzai awarded Henk Kamp the High State Medal of Ghazi Wazir Mohammad Akbar Khan.
Kamp left the House of Representatives on 1 January 2009 to head the transformation of Bonaire, Saba and St. Eustatius to special municipalities within the Netherlands.

On 13 September 2012, the day after the parliamentary elections, Kamp was asked to prepare for the formation of a new cabinet and had exploratory conversations with several parties. Already on that very day the Parliamentary leaders in the House of Representatives met with the President of the House of Representatives Gerdi Verbeet. His opinion after the talks was to start a formation on a coalition with the People's Party for Freedom and Democracy and the Labour Party with himself and former Leader of the Labour Party Wouter Bos as informateurs. The formation resulted in the forming of the Cabinet Rutte II and Kamp became Minister of Economic Affairs and took office on 5 November 2012. After the resignation of Minister of Security and Justice Ivo Opstelten on 10 March 2015, Kamp became the senior member of the Council of Ministers and the third highest-ranking member after Prime Minister Mark Rutte and Deputy Prime Minister Lodewijk Asscher.

Early February 2016 Kamp announced his retirement from national politics as of the 2017 elections.

Decorations

Notes

References

External links

Official
  H.G.J. (Henk) Kamp Parlement & Politiek

 

 

 

 

 

 

1952 births
Living people
Commanders of the Order of Orange-Nassau
Dutch chief executives in the healthcare industry
Dutch corporate directors
Dutch former Christians
Dutch humanists
Dutch nonprofit directors
Dutch trade association executives
Former Roman Catholics
Grand Cordons of the Order of the Rising Sun
Knights Commander of the Order of Merit of the Federal Republic of Germany
Members of the House of Representatives (Netherlands)
Members of the Provincial Council of Gelderland
Members of the Social and Economic Council
Ministers of Agriculture of the Netherlands
Ministers of Defence of the Netherlands
Ministers of Economic Affairs of the Netherlands
Ministers of Housing and Spatial Planning of the Netherlands
Ministers of Social Affairs of the Netherlands
Municipal councillors in Gelderland
People from Hengelo
People from Hof van Twente
People from Zutphen
People's Party for Freedom and Democracy politicians
Tax collectors
Recipients of the Grand Cross of the Order of Leopold II
20th-century Dutch civil servants
20th-century Dutch politicians
21st-century Dutch businesspeople
21st-century Dutch civil servants
21st-century Dutch politicians